Fanny Murdaugh Downing (Murdaugh; pen names, Viola and Frank Dashmore; October 19, 1831 - May 6, 1894) was a 19th-century American author and poet. She was the first resident novelist of Mecklenburg County, North Carolina. Downing's principal publications included: Nameless, a novel, 1865; Perfect though Suffering, a Tale, 1867 ; Florida, a Tale of the Land of Flowers; Pluto, or the Origin of Mint Julep, a story in verse. Most of her poems described her love and devotion for Confederate soldiers. In addition to Pluto, her best known poems were "The Legend of Catawba" and "Dixie".

Early life and education
Frances ("Fanny") Murdaugh was born in Portsmouth, Virginia, October 19, 1831. Her parents were Hon. John Washington Murdaugh, a distinguished name in Virginia; and Margaret Waller Murdaugh.

She was educated in a private school in Virginia.

Career
She was married, in 1851, to Charles W. Downing Jr., Esq., of Florida, and at that time its Secretary of State. They had four children, including a daughter, Margaret. During the Civil War, she lived in Virginia, and then became a refugee in Charlotte, North Carolina, remaining until 1869. Her literary life commenced in North Carolina, in 1863. Her health was not robust. Many of her works are composed while too weak to leave her bed. A comedy of three acts, called Nobody Hurt, was thus dashed off in ten hours. When she began to write for the public, she announced her intention in a letter to a friend: "I shall write first to see if I can write; then for money, and then for fame!"

She wrote hundreds of poem at this time, using the pseudonyms of "Frank Dashmore" and "Viola". Her first publication was a poem entitled "Folia Autumni", and its success was so great that it was rapidly followed by numerous other poetical effusions, most of which have a religious tinge, and seem subdued. They are all remarkable for musical rhythm, and an easy and graceful flow of feelings. Among the best of these are her "Egomet Ipse", a terrible heartsearcher; "Faithful unto Death", full of a wild and nameless pathos; and "Desolate", an elegiac poem.

These poems were followed by the novel, Nameless. It is said to have been hastily written in ten days, as a proof whether or not she could write prose. She had already written good poetry which was appreciated and applauded, and her next venture was in prose fiction. Her writing improved, developed, and matured in her next novels, Perfect through Suffering and Florida.

Then came a series of poems of a sterner sort, which were deemed by some to be rebellious. Of this style are "Confederate Gray", "Holly and Cypress", "Prometheus Vinctus", "Memorial Flowers", "Our President", "Two Years Ago", "Sic Semper Tyrannis", and "Dixie". She also wrote some love poems.

Personal life
Downing was active in the social life of Charlotte. She was a member of the Daughters of the American Revolution.

On April 24, 1894, it was reported that Downing was extremely ill at her residence. Downing died at her residence in Portsmouth, May 7, 1894. She was survived by a son, two daughters, a brother, Captain William Murdaugh, and a sister, Mrs. Washington Reed. A son, Charles, preceded her in death.

Selected works

Plays
 Nobody Hurt, a play

Novels
 Nameless, a novel, 1865
 Perfect though Suffering, a tale, 1867 
 Florida, a Tale of the Land of Flowers

Poetry
 Pluto, or the Origin of Mint Julep, a story in verse
 "The Legend of Catawba"
 "Dixie"

Notes

References

Attribution

Bibliography

External links
 

1831 births
1894 deaths
19th-century American women writers
19th-century American novelists
19th-century American poets
19th-century American dramatists and playwrights
19th-century pseudonymous writers
People from Portsmouth, Virginia
Writers from Virginia
Pseudonymous women writers
Daughters of the American Revolution people
American women novelists